William Rollason (born 29 November 1960) was the Chairman of the Direct Selling Association in London.

Rollason trained in corporate finance at Hambros Bank (1986–1995). Hambros was taken over by Société Générale. Before joining EHR, Rollason was Finance Director of National Express which he reportedly left in 2002 after a clash with chief executive Phil White.

He was then appointed CEO of Farepak. He went on to set up a parent company (EHR), which was largely financed by Farepak.

References

English businesspeople
1960 births
Living people